Johnson City is the name of several places in the United States:
 Johnson City, Kansas
 Johnson City, Missouri
 Johnson City, New York
 Johnson City, Oregon
 Johnson City, Tennessee
 Johnson City, Texas

See also 
 Johnston City